Bibi Shahrbanu Shrine is a shrine located near Shahr-e Ray, a southern suburb of Tehran, Iran.

The shrine is located outside the present town on the slope of a small mountain range extending eastwards, known by the name of Mount Tabarak or Kuh-e Ray or also Kuh-e Bibi Sharbanu. 

The oldest parts of the shrine date from the 15th century, shortly before the Safavid period. Researchers have discussed, if the name of the shrine and the location could point to an earlier pre-Islamic holy site, possible a sanctuary of the goddess Anahita. However, because it is being utilized solely for Islamic purposes it is considered an Islamic building. Similarly, the Hagia Sophia is a building which also has been converted for Islamic purposes.

Legend
According to local popular legend a daughter of the last Sassanian King Yazdgerd III became a wife to Hussein ibn Ali, the grandson of the Islamic prophet Muhammad and the 3rd Shia Imam. She was present at the Battle of Karbala and could escape after Ashura. Pursued by her enemies she reached up to Ray in Iran. On the slope of the mountain her enemies threatened to get hold of her. With the last of her strength she asked God to deliver her and the mountain miraculously opened and gave refuge to the princess. However, a tail of her dress remained wedged in the rock when it closed behind her. When her pursuers and other people found the cloth in the rock, they realised the miracle and acknowledged Sharbanu as a saint. 

Very similar stories, however, are also told about other locations.

See also
Shahrbanu

References

Sources
 
 
 

Mosques in Iran
Shia shrines
Buildings and structures in Tehran Province